Aashiqui.in is a 2011 Bollywood romantic film directed by Shankhadeep, starring Ankita Shrivastava and debutant Ishaan Singh Manhas in the lead roles. The music and the background score of the film are composed by Nitin kumar gupta and Prem Hariya, and the lyrics are penned by Gupta as well. The film is very similar to the 2004 film A Cinderella Story. The film was released in cinemas on 11 February 2011, and the story follows a man who meets his love interest on the internet.

Plot
Cyrus (Ishaan Singh Manhas) is a college swim champ who has difficulty in setting his future. He aspires to becoming a writer, but as his father (Kamal Malik) wishes him to take his swimming skills to a national level, Cyrus hides his aspirations so as not disappoint his dad. Though popular in college, he feels out of place and seeks someone who can really understand him.

When a child, April (Ankita Shrivastava) lived an idyllic lifestyle with her widowed restaurant-owner father (Amit Dhamija).  He remarries Mona (Sharmila Joshi), who herself has two daughters, Sania (Shubhi Ahuja) and Tanya (Preeti Gandwani). Soon after the marriage, April's father passes away, and her stepmother and step sisters begin to treat her like a servant. Years later, and even while burdened by domestic duties, April manages to attend college and keep a part-time job to earn pocket money.  Her only confidant is her childhood friend Raj (Dheeraj Miglani).

Cyrus and April meet anonymously online, becoming close without revealing their real-world identities.  When they finally decide for a real-world meeting, April is able to discover Cyrus' true identity beforehand, but he does not know hers. Feeling that he is too good for her, April avoids committing to a meeting. Cyrus, feeling he has finally found the one person who would understand him as both a friend and perhaps love, seeks her everywhere.

With Raj's help, April attends the college's Christmas costume party in a masked Cinderella costume where she recognizes Cyrus as her secret admirer, although her mask prevents him from recognizing her. Likewise, Raj manages to impress the "campus queen" Sonia (Tiya Gandwani). Unfortunately, Mona had forbidden April to attend the party, and so she is obliged to leave at midnight to prevent her stepmother from realizing she disobeyed her. In her haste, April loses one of her shoes on the staircase.

April is initially hesitant to reveal herself to Cyrus, and Sonia rejects Raj the next day when he reveals his identity to her. Sania and Tanya find the emails between April and Cyrus. After a failed attempt to trick Cyrus into believing either of them is Cinderella, they give the emails to Sonia, claiming that April intentionally made up her Cinderella persona to steal Cyrus, who was her childhood friend, from her.

As Cyrus' birthday is coming up, Sonia arranges a party at the restaurant. In order to humiliate April, she reveals April's identity to the guests and tricks Cyrus into insulting her.

Later at the restaurant, Sania and Tanya break a portrait of April's father and blame it on April. After Mona punishes her, April decides to leave her stepfamily once and for all. The other workers at the restaurant comes to her defense and quit their jobs in retaliation, and also allow April to live with them.

Before the next swimming competition, April confronts Cyrus about what had happened, and forgives him. Finally emboldened, Cyrus runs after April. Sonia, seeming to repent her previous cruelty, offers her blessing to Cyrus. Reuniting at the beach, Cyrus apologizes to April and returns her slipper, proposing marriage to her.

Cast
 Ishaan Singh Manhas as Cyrus
 Ankita Shrivastava as April
 Dheeraj Miglani as Raj Malhotra
 Tiya Gandwani as Sonia
 Preeti Gandwani as Tanya
 Shubhi Ahuja as Sania
 Deepan Shah as Danny
 Sharmila Joshi as Mona
 Ankitha as Riya
 Kamal Malik as Cyrus's Father
 Amit Dhamija as April's Father
 Kalpesh as Robo

Themes
Inspired by the original Cinderella tale, the film involves a young woman being controlled by an overbearing step-mother and two step-sisters in a storyline which includes a hero protagonist mimicking the Cinderella Prince Charming, the two meeting at a costumed ball, the heroine rushing to leave before midnight, a glass shoe being left behind when she leaves the ball, and after the hero's search for her, he and the heroine live "happily ever after."

Production

The choreographer is Pradeep Kalekar

Release
Originally intended for a January 2011 release, the film was released to theaters on 11 February 2011.

Reception
Rao Renuka of Daily News and Analysis offers that the film is a poor depiction of the Cinderella story. She writes that "It is unbelievable how at a time when audiences are discovering joyrides like Yeh Saali Zindagi and Dhobi Ghat, filmmaking debacles such as Aashiqui.in dare to even present themselves to viewers." She expands that the film has a poor plot, that actors seem to compete on screen for title of "worst performance", and that through its "storyline, over-the-top performances, and unsophisticated, rough editing" the film "makes a mockery of the Cinderella legend."

Soundtrack

References

External links
 
 
 

2011 films
2010s Hindi-language films
Indian romantic comedy films
Films shot in India
Hindi-language romance films